Half may refer to:

 One half, an irreducible fraction resulting from dividing one by two
Or else:
 half.com, a website run by eBay that sells books, movies, video games, music, etc.
 Halves (band), an Irish post-rock band
 Halving, the operation of division by two
 A half precision floating point representation in computer sciences
 "A half", a half pint of an alcoholic beverage
 "Half" a song by Soundgarden on the album Superunknown
 Other half, an affectionate term for a member of an intimate relationship
 A person being one half Japanese, and one half gaijin

See also 
 Hafu (disambiguation)
 Second (disambiguation)